Blue Rose is the debut studio album by Rosemary Clooney, in collaboration with Duke Ellington and his orchestra, released in mono on Columbia Records, catalogue CL 872. Although she had appeared on albums before, it had been in the context of either a musical theater or multiple artist recording. The album also marked the return of Ellington to Columbia after an absence of four years, and was one of the first examples of overdubbing being used as an integral part of the creation, rather than for effects or to correct mistakes.

Background and content 
During the early 1950s, it had been the policy of both company president Goddard Lieberson and producer Mitch Miller at Columbia to discourage their roster of popular singers from planning full albums, the LP reserved for serious work such as classical music or original cast recordings. This policy changed with the success of popular music albums on other labels, and to give the return of Ellington to the fold exposure beyond the jazz audience, producer Irving Townsend decided on pairing the Ellington band with a singer for a full album, choosing Clooney for her sultry voice and her spate of hit records throughout the decade.

The project encountered difficulty from Clooney being both on the outs with her usual producer Mitch Miller and pregnant in Los Angeles, with the Ellington Orchestra being recorded in New York. With Townsend at the helm, Clooney agreed to the project, and long-time Ellington orchestrator and musical foil Billy Strayhorn was dispatched to guide Clooney through the arrangements and recording in L.A.

Recordings of the Ellington Orchestra took place on January 23 and 27, 1956, at Columbia's 30th Street Studio in New York, and Clooney's vocals were recorded for overdubbing to the New York track on February 8 and 11 in Los Angeles. The material selected originated from the Ellington songbook, and all songs were arranged by Strayhorn.  The title tune was specifically written by Ellington for the album and Clooney.

On June 15, 1999, Legacy Records reissued the album remastered for compact disc. Two bonus tracks were added from the sessions that were not included on the original LP, released as Columbia single 55591 "If You Were in My Place (What Would You Do?)" and its b-side "Just A-Sittin' and A-Rockin'."

Track listing

Personnel 
 Rosemary Clooney – vocals
 Duke Ellington – piano
 Billy Strayhorn – arranger, conductor, piano on bonus tracks
 Cat Anderson, Willie Cook, Ray Nance, Clark Terry – trumpets
 Quentin Jackson, Britt Woodman – trombones
 John Sanders – valve trombone
 Russell Procope – alto saxophone, clarinet
 Johnny Hodges – alto saxophone
 Jimmy Hamilton – tenor saxophone, clarinet
 Paul Gonsalves – tenor saxophone
 Harry Carney – baritone saxophone
 Jimmy Woode – bass
 Sam Woodyard – drums

References 

1956 debut albums
Rosemary Clooney albums
Duke Ellington albums
Albums arranged by Billy Strayhorn
Columbia Records albums
Albums conducted by Billy Strayhorn
Albums produced by Irving Townsend